Moore Haven is a city in, and the county seat of, Glades County, Florida, United States. The population was 1,680 at the 2010 census. Moore Haven is located on the southwest shoreline of Lake Okeechobee.

History

The community was named after James A. Moore, its founder.  In its early days, Moore Haven was often called "Little Chicago", reflecting its status as a significant boom town.  It was ideally located at the apex of Lake Okeechobee and the Caloosahatchee Canal.

First Woman Mayor of the South 
In 1917, Marian Newhall Horwitz was elected as, not only the first woman mayor of Moore Haven, or the first woman mayor in Florida, she was additionally, the first female mayor south of the Mason-Dixon line.

Horwitz was described by the Moore Haven Times, in a July 27, 1917 issue, as being "business from head to foot" along with being seen regularly at 5:15 am riding horseback to work. She resigned on June 22, 1918, taking over management of the Desoto Land Company after her second husband, John J. O'Brien, left to serve in World War I, and after her decision to live on the farm, outside the city limits.

After stepping down as mayor, a "grateful citizenry" gave her a silver trophy, which was eventually passed to her son, Dr. Orville Horwitz, as of 1985.

Railroad 

Horwitz is credited with bringing the railroad to Moore Haven, while her brother was a business associate of J.P. Morgan, the vice-president of the Atlantic Coastline Railroad.

In 1918, construction of the first extension line was finished, bringing Moore Haven's first train on May 13, 1918. The twenty passengers and fifteen freight cars arrived ninety minutes late.  "Late arrivals, unannounced schedule changes, and faulty equipment, as well as derailments, were to plague the railroad from the start."  The train was often called the "Hinky Dink" and the "Muck Special."  In addition to nicknames, a well-known joke about the train circulated, too, "a middle-aged man, who got off the train at Moore Haven, had left Haines City, as a young boy, in the care of the conductor."

Impact of Hurricanes 

The Great Miami Hurricane of 1926 dramatically altered the landscape of the area.  The storm surge from the lake caused widespread death and destruction, sometimes literally relocating houses to the opposite side of the river.  The town might have recovered, but it was hit not long after by the 1928 Okeechobee Hurricane. This decimated areas that had escaped damage in 1926.

Today, Moore Haven is a small, sleepy town that has little industry and infrastructure.  Moore Haven is home to the Annual Chalo Nitka Festival, which is held the first weekend in March.

There are two access points to the Lake Okeechobee Scenic Trail, which passes through the town and around Lake Okeechobee.

Built in 2000 and crossing across the Caloosahatchee River 900 feet east of First Street, the Mamie Langdale Memorial Bridge breaks the Florida record of being the Longest Concrete I Girder Span, measuring 320 feet.  The overall total length of the Prestressed Stringer/Multi-beam bridge equals 2,281 feet.

The Westergaard House, built in 1920, located on 270 Avenue L Southwest, is the headquarters of the Glades County Historical Society.

Geography

Climate

Demographics

As of the census of 2000, there were 1,635 people, 572 households, and 414 families residing in the city. The racial makeup of the city was 61.28% White, 22.32% African American, 0.80% Native American, 0.43% Asian, 14.56% from other races, and 0.61% from two or more races. Hispanic or Latino of any race were 28.01% of the population.

There were 572 households, out of which 35.0% had children under the age of 18 living with them, 48.8% were married couples living together, 14.5% had a female householder with no husband present, and 27.6% were non-families. 22.0% of all households were made up of individuals, and 10.1% had someone living alone who was 65 years of age or older. The average household size was 2.81 and the average family size was 3.23.

In the city, the population was spread out, with 31.8% under the age of 18, 8.1% from 18 to 24, 25.5% from 25 to 44, 19.8% from 45 to 64, and 14.8% who were 65 years of age or older. The median age was 33 years. For every 100 females, there were 107.8 males. For every 100 females age 18 and over, there were 109.2 males.

The median income for a household in the city was $26,801, and the median income for a family was $28,542. Males had a median income of $26,615 versus $20,250 for females. The per capita income for the city was $12,183. About 19.0% of families and 23.8% of the population were below the poverty line, including 30.0% of those under age 18 and 16.8% of those age 65 or over.

Arts and culture

Historic district 

The Moore Haven Downtown Historic District is a U.S. historic district, designated as such in 1995. The district contains seven historic buildings, and has a park which houses the only Cypress tree in the district.

Education 

 Moore Haven Elementary School
 Moore Haven Middle-High School

References

External links

 Official website

County seats in Florida
Cities in Glades County, Florida
Populated places on Lake Okeechobee
Cities in Florida